Samuel Irenæus Prime (1812–1885) was an American clergyman, traveler, and writer.

Life
He was born at Ballston, N. Y. to Benjamin Youngs Prime. He graduated from Williams College in 1829. Three years later he entered Princeton Theological Seminary, was licensed to preach in 1833, and in 1835 was installed pastor of the Presbyterian Church at Ballston Spa, N. Y. For a time he was principal of the academy at Newburgh, N. Y. In 1840 he entered upon the chief work of his life as editor of the New York Observer, a paper of which he afterward came to be the principal owner. His brother and then his son-in-law, Rev. Charles A. Stoddard, carried on the editorship after his death. He was the founder of the New York Association for the Advancement of Science and Art, president and trustee of Wells College, and a trustee of Williams College.

He was the great-grandson of noted American patriot and pastor, Ebenezer Prime, grandson of Benjamin Prime, and the son of Nathaniel Scudder Prime (1785–1856).

Works
With many books of religious character, Prime published:
 
 Life in New York (1848)
 Travels in Europe and the East (1855)
 The Power of Prayer (1859)
 Letters from Switzerland (1860)
 American Wit and Humor (1859)
 The Alhambra and the Kremlin (1873)
 Life of Samuel F. B. Morse (1875)
 Irenæus Letters (1880, 1885)

References
Notes

Sources
 E. D. G. Prime, Notes... of the Prime Family (New York, 1888)
 Wendell Prime (editor), "Samuel Irenaeus Prime. Autobiography and memorials (New York, 1888), 
 
Autobiography in Irenæus Letters'' (second series, New York, 1885).

External links

 
 

Williams College alumni
American autobiographers
American theologians
American Presbyterians
American biographers
1812 births
1885 deaths
19th-century American newspaper publishers (people)
19th-century Presbyterian ministers
Wells College trustees
19th-century American journalists
American male journalists
19th-century male writers
Journalists from New York City
Burials at Woodlawn Cemetery (Bronx, New York)